Lutfun Nesa Khan is a Workers Party of Bangladesh politician who is elected as a member of 11th Jatiya Sangsad of Reserved Seats for Women.

References

Living people
Workers Party of Bangladesh politicians
11th Jatiya Sangsad members
Women members of the Jatiya Sangsad
Year of birth missing (living people)
21st-century Bangladeshi women politicians